

Cl

Cla

Clab-Clap

|- class="vcard"
| class="fn org" | Clabhach
| class="adr" | Argyll and Bute
| class="note" | 
| class="note" | 
|- class="vcard"
| class="fn org" | Clachaig
| class="adr" | Highland
| class="note" | 
| class="note" | 
|- class="vcard"
| class="fn org" | Clachaig
| class="adr" | Argyll and Bute
| class="note" | 
| class="note" | 
|- class="vcard"
| class="fn org" | Clachan (Sutherland)
| class="adr" | Highland
| class="note" | 
| class="note" | 
|- class="vcard"
| class="fn org" | Clachan (Skye)
| class="adr" | Highland
| class="note" | 
| class="note" | 
|- class="vcard"
| class="fn org" | Clachan (Raasay)
| class="adr" | Highland
| class="note" | 
| class="note" | 
|- class="vcard"
| class="fn org" | Clachan
| class="adr" | Western Isles
| class="note" | 
| class="note" | 
|- class="vcard"
| class="fn org" | Clachan (Cowal)
| class="adr" | Argyll and Bute
| class="note" | 
| class="note" | 
|- class="vcard"
| class="fn org" | Clachan (Kintyre)
| class="adr" | Argyll and Bute
| class="note" | 
| class="note" | 
|- class="vcard"
| class="fn org" | Clachan (Lismore)
| class="adr" | Argyll and Bute
| class="note" | 
| class="note" | 
|- class="vcard"
| class="fn org" | Clachan-a-Luib
| class="adr" | Western Isles
| class="note" | 
| class="note" | 
|- class="vcard"
| class="fn org" | Clachan of Campsie
| class="adr" | East Dunbartonshire
| class="note" | 
| class="note" | 
|- class="vcard"
| class="fn org" | Clachan of Glendaruel
| class="adr" | Argyll and Bute
| class="note" | 
| class="note" | 
|- class="vcard"
| class="fn org" | Clachan-Seil
| class="adr" | Argyll and Bute
| class="note" | 
| class="note" | 
|- class="vcard"
| class="fn org" | Clachbreck
| class="adr" | Argyll and Bute
| class="note" | 
| class="note" | 
|- class="vcard"
| class="fn org" | Clachnaharry
| class="adr" | Highland
| class="note" | 
| class="note" | 
|- class="vcard"
| class="fn org" | Clachtoll
| class="adr" | Highland
| class="note" | 
| class="note" | 
|- class="vcard"
| class="fn org" | Clackmannan
| class="adr" | Clackmannanshire
| class="note" | 
| class="note" | 
|- class="vcard"
| class="fn org" | Clackmarras
| class="adr" | Moray
| class="note" | 
| class="note" | 
|- class="vcard"
| class="fn org" | Clacton-on-Sea
| class="adr" | Essex
| class="note" | 
| class="note" | 
|- class="vcard"
| class="fn org" | Cladach
| class="adr" | North Ayrshire
| class="note" | 
| class="note" | 
|- class="vcard"
| class="fn org" | Cladach a' Bhaile Shear
| class="adr" | Western Isles
| class="note" | 
| class="note" | 
|- class="vcard"
| class="fn org" | Claddach
| class="adr" | Argyll and Bute
| class="note" | 
| class="note" | 
|- class="vcard"
| class="fn org" | Claddach Illeray
| class="adr" | Western Isles
| class="note" | 
| class="note" | 
|- class="vcard"
| class="fn org" | Claddach Kirkibost
| class="adr" | Western Isles
| class="note" | 
| class="note" | 
|- class="vcard"
| class="fn org" | Claddach-knockline
| class="adr" | Western Isles
| class="note" | 
| class="note" | 
|- class="vcard"
| class="fn org" | Cladh a' Mhanaich
| class="adr" | Highland
| class="note" | 
| class="note" | 
|- class="vcard"
| class="fn org" | Cladich
| class="adr" | Argyll and Bute
| class="note" | 
| class="note" | 
|- class="vcard"
| class="fn org" | Cladswell
| class="adr" | Worcestershire
| class="note" | 
| class="note" | 
|- class="vcard"
| class="fn org" | Claggan
| class="adr" | Highland
| class="note" | 
| class="note" | 
|- class="vcard"
| class="fn org" | Claigan
| class="adr" | Highland
| class="note" | 
| class="note" | 
|- class="vcard"
| class="fn org" | Claiggain
| class="adr" | Argyll and Bute
| class="note" | 
| class="note" | 
|- class="vcard"
| class="fn org" | Claines
| class="adr" | Worcestershire
| class="note" | 
| class="note" | 
|- class="vcard"
| class="fn org" | Clairinsh
| class="adr" | Stirling
| class="note" | 
| class="note" | 
|- class="vcard"
| class="fn org" | Clandown
| class="adr" | Bath and North East Somerset
| class="note" | 
| class="note" | 
|- class="vcard"
| class="fn org" | Clanfield
| class="adr" | Hampshire
| class="note" | 
| class="note" | 
|- class="vcard"
| class="fn org" | Clanfield
| class="adr" | Oxfordshire
| class="note" | 
| class="note" | 
|- class="vcard"
| class="fn org" | Clanking
| class="adr" | Buckinghamshire
| class="note" | 
| class="note" | 
|- class="vcard"
| class="fn org" | Clanville
| class="adr" | Hampshire
| class="note" | 
| class="note" | 
|- class="vcard"
| class="fn org" | Clanville
| class="adr" | Somerset
| class="note" | 
| class="note" | 
|- class="vcard"
| class="fn org" | Clanville
| class="adr" | Wiltshire
| class="note" | 
| class="note" | 
|- class="vcard"
| class="fn org" | Claonaig
| class="adr" | Argyll and Bute
| class="note" | 
| class="note" | 
|- class="vcard"
| class="fn org" | Clapgate
| class="adr" | Dorset
| class="note" | 
| class="note" | 
|- class="vcard"
| class="fn org" | Clapgate
| class="adr" | Hertfordshire
| class="note" | 
| class="note" | 
|- class="vcard"
| class="fn org" | Clapham
| class="adr" | Bedfordshire
| class="note" | 
| class="note" | 
|- class="vcard"
| class="fn org" | Clapham
| class="adr" | Devon
| class="note" | 
| class="note" | 
|- class="vcard"
| class="fn org" | Clapham
| class="adr" | Lambeth
| class="note" | 
| class="note" | 
|- class="vcard"
| class="fn org" | Clapham
| class="adr" | North Yorkshire
| class="note" | 
| class="note" | 
|- class="vcard"
| class="fn org" | Clapham
| class="adr" | West Sussex
| class="note" | 
| class="note" | 
|- class="vcard"
| class="fn org" | Clapham Green
| class="adr" | Bedfordshire
| class="note" | 
| class="note" | 
|- class="vcard"
| class="fn org" | Clapham Green
| class="adr" | North Yorkshire
| class="note" | 
| class="note" | 
|- class="vcard"
| class="fn org" | Clapham Hill
| class="adr" | Kent
| class="note" | 
| class="note" | 
|- class="vcard"
| class="fn org" | Clapham Park
| class="adr" | Wandsworth
| class="note" | 
| class="note" | 
|- class="vcard"
| class="fn org" | Clap Hill
| class="adr" | Kent
| class="note" | 
| class="note" | 
|- class="vcard"
| class="fn org" | Clapper
| class="adr" | Cornwall
| class="note" | 
| class="note" | 
|- class="vcard"
| class="fn org" | Clapper Hill
| class="adr" | Kent
| class="note" | 
| class="note" | 
|- class="vcard"
| class="fn org" | Clappersgate
| class="adr" | Cumbria
| class="note" | 
| class="note" | 
|- class="vcard"
| class="fn org" | Clapton
| class="adr" | Berkshire
| class="note" | 
| class="note" | 
|- class="vcard"
| class="fn org" | Clapton (Wayford)
| class="adr" | Somerset
| class="note" | 
| class="note" | 
|- class="vcard"
| class="fn org" | Clapton (Ston Easton)
| class="adr" | Somerset
| class="note" | 
| class="note" | 
|- class="vcard"
| class="fn org" | Clapton in Gordano
| class="adr" | North Somerset
| class="note" | 
| class="note" | 
|- class="vcard"
| class="fn org" | Clapton-on-the-Hill
| class="adr" | Gloucestershire
| class="note" | 
| class="note" | 
|- class="vcard"
| class="fn org" | Clapton Park
| class="adr" | Hackney
| class="note" | 
| class="note" | 
|- class="vcard"
| class="fn org" | Clapworthy
| class="adr" | Devon
| class="note" | 
| class="note" | 
|}

Clar

|- class="vcard"
| class="fn org" | Clarach
| class="adr" | Ceredigion
| class="note" | 
| class="note" | 
|- class="vcard"
| class="fn org" | Clara Vale
| class="adr" | Gateshead
| class="note" | 
| class="note" | 
|- class="vcard"
| class="fn org" | Clarbeston
| class="adr" | Pembrokeshire
| class="note" | 
| class="note" | 
|- class="vcard"
| class="fn org" | Clarbeston Road
| class="adr" | Pembrokeshire
| class="note" | 
| class="note" | 
|- class="vcard"
| class="fn org" | Clarborough
| class="adr" | Nottinghamshire
| class="note" | 
| class="note" | 
|- class="vcard"
| class="fn org" | Clare
| class="adr" | Oxfordshire
| class="note" | 
| class="note" | 
|- class="vcard"
| class="fn org" | Clare
| class="adr" | Suffolk
| class="note" | 
| class="note" | 
|- class="vcard"
| class="fn org" | Claregate
| class="adr" | Wolverhampton
| class="note" | 
| class="note" | 
|- class="vcard"
| class="fn org" | Claremont Park
| class="adr" | Surrey
| class="note" | 
| class="note" | 
|- class="vcard"
| class="fn org" | Claremount
| class="adr" | Calderdale
| class="note" | 
| class="note" | 
|- class="vcard"
| class="fn org" | Clarencefield
| class="adr" | Dumfries and Galloway
| class="note" | 
| class="note" | 
|- class="vcard"
| class="fn org" | Clarence Park
| class="adr" | North Somerset
| class="note" | 
| class="note" | 
|- class="vcard"
| class="fn org" | Clarendon Park
| class="adr" | City of Leicester
| class="note" | 
| class="note" | 
|- class="vcard"
| class="fn org" | Clareston
| class="adr" | Pembrokeshire
| class="note" | 
| class="note" | 
|- class="vcard"
| class="fn org" | Clarilaw
| class="adr" | Scottish Borders
| class="note" | 
| class="note" | 
|- class="vcard"
| class="fn org" | Clarken Green
| class="adr" | Hampshire
| class="note" | 
| class="note" | 
|- class="vcard"
| class="fn org" | Clark Green
| class="adr" | Cheshire
| class="note" | 
| class="note" | 
|- class="vcard"
| class="fn org" | Clarksfield
| class="adr" | Oldham
| class="note" | 
| class="note" | 
|- class="vcard"
| class="fn org" | Clark's Green
| class="adr" | Surrey
| class="note" | 
| class="note" | 
|- class="vcard"
| class="fn org" | Clark's Hill
| class="adr" | Lincolnshire
| class="note" | 
| class="note" | 
|- class="vcard"
| class="fn org" | Clarkston
| class="adr" | North Lanarkshire
| class="note" | 
| class="note" | 
|- class="vcard"
| class="fn org" | Clarkston
| class="adr" | East Renfrewshire
| class="note" | 
| class="note" | 
|}

Clas-Clau

|- class="vcard"
| class="fn org" | Clase
| class="adr" | Swansea
| class="note" | 
| class="note" | 
|- class="vcard"
| class="fn org" | Clashandorran
| class="adr" | Highland
| class="note" | 
| class="note" | 
|- class="vcard"
| class="fn org" | Clashmore (Assynt)
| class="adr" | Highland
| class="note" | 
| class="note" | 
|- class="vcard"
| class="fn org" | Clashmore (Dornoch)
| class="adr" | Highland
| class="note" | 
| class="note" | 
|- class="vcard"
| class="fn org" | Clashnessie
| class="adr" | Highland
| class="note" | 
| class="note" | 
|- class="vcard"
| class="fn org" | Clashnoir
| class="adr" | Moray
| class="note" | 
| class="note" | 
|- class="vcard"
| class="fn org" | Clate
| class="adr" | Shetland Islands
| class="note" | 
| class="note" | 
|- class="vcard"
| class="fn org" | Clatford
| class="adr" | Wiltshire
| class="note" | 
| class="note" | 
|- class="vcard"
| class="fn org" | Clatford Oakcuts
| class="adr" | Hampshire
| class="note" | 
| class="note" | 
|- class="vcard"
| class="fn org" | Clathy
| class="adr" | Perth and Kinross
| class="note" | 
| class="note" | 
|- class="vcard"
| class="fn org" | Clatt
| class="adr" | Aberdeenshire
| class="note" | 
| class="note" | 
|- class="vcard"
| class="fn org" | Clatter
| class="adr" | Powys
| class="note" | 
| class="note" | 
|- class="vcard"
| class="fn org" | Clatterford
| class="adr" | Isle of Wight
| class="note" | 
| class="note" | 
|- class="vcard"
| class="fn org" | Clatterford End (Chelmsford)
| class="adr" | Essex
| class="note" | 
| class="note" | 
|- class="vcard"
| class="fn org" | Clatterford End (Toot Hill)
| class="adr" | Essex
| class="note" | 
| class="note" | 
|- class="vcard"
| class="fn org" | Clatterford End (Fyfield)
| class="adr" | Essex
| class="note" | 
| class="note" | 
|- class="vcard"
| class="fn org" | Clatto
| class="adr" | Fife
| class="note" | 
| class="note" | 
|- class="vcard"
| class="fn org" | Clatworthy
| class="adr" | Somerset
| class="note" | 
| class="note" | 
|- class="vcard"
| class="fn org" | Clauchlands
| class="adr" | North Ayrshire
| class="note" | 
| class="note" | 
|- class="vcard"
| class="fn org" | Clauchlands Point
| class="adr" | North Ayrshire
| class="note" | 
| class="note" | 
|- class="vcard"
| class="fn org" | Claughton
| class="adr" | Lancashire
| class="note" | 
| class="note" | 
|- class="vcard"
| class="fn org" | Claughton on Brock
| class="adr" | Lancashire
| class="note" | 
| class="note" | 
|- class="vcard"
| class="fn org" | Claughton
| class="adr" | Wirral
| class="note" | 
| class="note" | 
|}

Clav-Clax

|- class="vcard"
| class="fn org" | Clavelshay
| class="adr" | Somerset
| class="note" | 
| class="note" | 
|- class="vcard"
| class="fn org" | Claverdon
| class="adr" | Warwickshire
| class="note" | 
| class="note" | 
|- class="vcard"
| class="fn org" | Claverham
| class="adr" | North Somerset
| class="note" | 
| class="note" | 
|- class="vcard"
| class="fn org" | Claverhambury
| class="adr" | Essex
| class="note" | 
| class="note" | 
|- class="vcard"
| class="fn org" | Clavering
| class="adr" | Essex
| class="note" | 
| class="note" | 
|- class="vcard"
| class="fn org" | Claverley
| class="adr" | Shropshire
| class="note" | 
| class="note" | 
|- class="vcard"
| class="fn org" | Claverton
| class="adr" | Bath and North East Somerset
| class="note" | 
| class="note" | 
|- class="vcard"
| class="fn org" | Claverton Down
| class="adr" | Bath and North East Somerset
| class="note" | 
| class="note" | 
|- class="vcard"
| class="fn org" | Clawdd-coch
| class="adr" | The Vale Of Glamorgan
| class="note" | 
| class="note" | 
|- class="vcard"
| class="fn org" | Clawdd-newydd
| class="adr" | Denbighshire
| class="note" | 
| class="note" | 
|- class="vcard"
| class="fn org" | Clawdd Poncen
| class="adr" | Denbighshire
| class="note" | 
| class="note" | 
|- class="vcard"
| class="fn org" | Clawthorpe
| class="adr" | Cumbria
| class="note" | 
| class="note" | 
|- class="vcard"
| class="fn org" | Clawton
| class="adr" | Devon
| class="note" | 
| class="note" | 
|- class="vcard"
| class="fn org" | Claxby (by Normanby)
| class="adr" | Lincolnshire
| class="note" | 
| class="note" | 
|- class="vcard"
| class="fn org" | Claxby (St Andrew)
| class="adr" | Lincolnshire
| class="note" | 
| class="note" | 
|- class="vcard"
| class="fn org" | Claxton
| class="adr" | Norfolk
| class="note" | 
| class="note" | 
|- class="vcard"
| class="fn org" | Claxton
| class="adr" | North Yorkshire
| class="note" | 
| class="note" | 
|}

Clay

|- class="vcard"
| class="fn org" | Claybrooke Magna
| class="adr" | Leicestershire
| class="note" | 
| class="note" | 
|- class="vcard"
| class="fn org" | Claybrooke Parva
| class="adr" | Leicestershire
| class="note" | 
| class="note" | 
|- class="vcard"
| class="fn org" | Clay Common
| class="adr" | Suffolk
| class="note" | 
| class="note" | 
|- class="vcard"
| class="fn org" | Clay Coton
| class="adr" | Northamptonshire
| class="note" | 
| class="note" | 
|- class="vcard"
| class="fn org" | Clay Cross
| class="adr" | Derbyshire
| class="note" | 
| class="note" | 
|- class="vcard"
| class="fn org" | Claydon
| class="adr" | Warwickshire
| class="note" | 
| class="note" | 
|- class="vcard"
| class="fn org" | Claydon
| class="adr" | Suffolk
| class="note" | 
| class="note" | 
|- class="vcard"
| class="fn org" | Claydon
| class="adr" | Gloucestershire
| class="note" | 
| class="note" | 
|- class="vcard"
| class="fn org" | Clay End
| class="adr" | Hertfordshire
| class="note" | 
| class="note" | 
|- class="vcard"
| class="fn org" | Claygate (Collier Street)
| class="adr" | Kent
| class="note" | 
| class="note" | 
|- class="vcard"
| class="fn org" | Claygate (Shipbourne)
| class="adr" | Kent
| class="note" | 
| class="note" | 
|- class="vcard"
| class="fn org" | Claygate
| class="adr" | Surrey
| class="note" | 
| class="note" | 
|- class="vcard"
| class="fn org" | Claygate
| class="adr" | Dumfries and Galloway
| class="note" | 
| class="note" | 
|- class="vcard"
| class="fn org" | Claygate Cross
| class="adr" | Kent
| class="note" | 
| class="note" | 
|- class="vcard"
| class="fn org" | Clayhall
| class="adr" | Hampshire
| class="note" | 
| class="note" | 
|- class="vcard"
| class="fn org" | Clayhall
| class="adr" | Redbridge
| class="note" | 
| class="note" | 
|- class="vcard"
| class="fn org" | Clayhanger
| class="adr" | Devon
| class="note" | 
| class="note" | 
|- class="vcard"
| class="fn org" | Clayhanger
| class="adr" | Somerset
| class="note" | 
| class="note" | 
|- class="vcard"
| class="fn org" | Clayhanger
| class="adr" | Walsall
| class="note" | 
| class="note" | 
|- class="vcard"
| class="fn org" | Clay Head
| class="adr" | Isle of Man
| class="note" | 
| class="note" | 
|- class="vcard"
| class="fn org" | Clayhidon
| class="adr" | Devon
| class="note" | 
| class="note" | 
|- class="vcard"
| class="fn org" | Clayhill
| class="adr" | East Sussex
| class="note" | 
| class="note" | 
|- class="vcard"
| class="fn org" | Clayhill
| class="adr" | Hampshire
| class="note" | 
| class="note" | 
|- class="vcard"
| class="fn org" | Clay Hill
| class="adr" | Berkshire
| class="note" | 
| class="note" | 
|- class="vcard"
| class="fn org" | Clay Hill
| class="adr" | City of Bristol
| class="note" | 
| class="note" | 
|- class="vcard"
| class="fn org" | Clay Hill
| class="adr" | Enfield
| class="note" | 
| class="note" | 
|- class="vcard"
| class="fn org" | Clayhithe
| class="adr" | Cambridgeshire
| class="note" | 
| class="note" | 
|- class="vcard"
| class="fn org" | Clayholes
| class="adr" | Angus
| class="note" | 
| class="note" | 
|- class="vcard"
| class="fn org" | Clay Lake
| class="adr" | Lincolnshire
| class="note" | 
| class="note" | 
|- class="vcard"
| class="fn org" | Clayland
| class="adr" | Stirling
| class="note" | 
| class="note" | 
|- class="vcard"
| class="fn org" | Clay Mills
| class="adr" | Staffordshire
| class="note" | 
| class="note" | 
|- class="vcard"
| class="fn org" | Claypit Hill
| class="adr" | Cambridgeshire
| class="note" | 
| class="note" | 
|- class="vcard"
| class="fn org" | Claypits
| class="adr" | Gloucestershire
| class="note" | 
| class="note" | 
|- class="vcard"
| class="fn org" | Claypits
| class="adr" | Kent
| class="note" | 
| class="note" | 
|- class="vcard"
| class="fn org" | Claypits
| class="adr" | Suffolk
| class="note" | 
| class="note" | 
|- class="vcard"
| class="fn org" | Claypole
| class="adr" | Lincolnshire
| class="note" | 
| class="note" | 
|- class="vcard"
| class="fn org" | Clays End
| class="adr" | Bath and North East Somerset
| class="note" | 
| class="note" | 
|- class="vcard"
| class="fn org" | Claythorpe
| class="adr" | Lincolnshire
| class="note" | 
| class="note" | 
|- class="vcard"
| class="fn org" | Clayton
| class="adr" | Bradford
| class="note" | 
| class="note" | 
|- class="vcard"
| class="fn org" | Clayton
| class="adr" | Doncaster
| class="note" | 
| class="note" | 
|- class="vcard"
| class="fn org" | Clayton
| class="adr" | Fife
| class="note" | 
| class="note" | 
|- class="vcard"
| class="fn org" | Clayton
| class="adr" | Manchester
| class="note" | 
| class="note" | 
|- class="vcard"
| class="fn org" | Clayton
| class="adr" | Staffordshire
| class="note" | 
| class="note" | 
|- class="vcard"
| class="fn org" | Clayton
| class="adr" | West Sussex
| class="note" | 
| class="note" | 
|- class="vcard"
| class="fn org" | Clayton Brook
| class="adr" | Lancashire
| class="note" | 
| class="note" | 
|- class="vcard"
| class="fn org" | Clayton Green
| class="adr" | Lancashire
| class="note" | 
| class="note" | 
|- class="vcard"
| class="fn org" | Clayton Heights
| class="adr" | Bradford
| class="note" | 
| class="note" | 
|- class="vcard"
| class="fn org" | Clayton Le Dale
| class="adr" | Lancashire
| class="note" | 
| class="note" | 
|- class="vcard"
| class="fn org" | Clayton-Le-Moors
| class="adr" | Lancashire
| class="note" | 
| class="note" | 
|- class="vcard"
| class="fn org" | Clayton-le-Woods
| class="adr" | Lancashire
| class="note" | 
| class="note" | 
|- class="vcard"
| class="fn org" | Clayton West
| class="adr" | Kirklees
| class="note" | 
| class="note" | 
|- class="vcard"
| class="fn org" | Clayworth
| class="adr" | Nottinghamshire
| class="note" | 
| class="note" | 
|}

Cle

|- class="vcard"
| class="fn org" | Cleadale
| class="adr" | Highland
| class="note" | 
| class="note" | 
|- class="vcard"
| class="fn org" | Cleadon
| class="adr" | South Tyneside
| class="note" | 
| class="note" | 
|- class="vcard"
| class="fn org" | Cleadon Park
| class="adr" | South Tyneside
| class="note" | 
| class="note" | 
|- class="vcard"
| class="fn org" | Clearbrook
| class="adr" | Devon
| class="note" | 
| class="note" | 
|- class="vcard"
| class="fn org" | Clearwell
| class="adr" | Gloucestershire
| class="note" | 
| class="note" | 
|- class="vcard"
| class="fn org" | Clearwell
| class="adr" | City of Newport
| class="note" | 
| class="note" | 
|- class="vcard"
| class="fn org" | Clearwood
| class="adr" | Wiltshire
| class="note" | 
| class="note" | 
|- class="vcard"
| class="fn org" | Cleasby
| class="adr" | North Yorkshire
| class="note" | 
| class="note" | 
|- class="vcard"
| class="fn org" | Cleat
| class="adr" | Orkney Islands
| class="note" | 
| class="note" | 
|- class="vcard"
| class="fn org" | Cleat
| class="adr" | Western Isles
| class="note" | 
| class="note" | 
|- class="vcard"
| class="fn org" | Cleatlam
| class="adr" | Durham
| class="note" | 
| class="note" | 
|- class="vcard"
| class="fn org" | Cleator
| class="adr" | Cumbria
| class="note" | 
| class="note" | 
|- class="vcard"
| class="fn org" | Cleator Moor
| class="adr" | Cumbria
| class="note" | 
| class="note" | 
|- class="vcard"
| class="fn org" | Cleave
| class="adr" | Devon
| class="note" | 
| class="note" | 
|- class="vcard"
| class="fn org" | Cleckheaton
| class="adr" | Kirklees
| class="note" | 
| class="note" | 
|- class="vcard"
| class="fn org" | Cleddon
| class="adr" | Monmouthshire
| class="note" | 
| class="note" | 
|- class="vcard"
| class="fn org" | Cleedownton
| class="adr" | Shropshire
| class="note" | 
| class="note" | 
|- class="vcard"
| class="fn org" | Cleehill
| class="adr" | Shropshire
| class="note" | 
| class="note" | 
|- class="vcard"
| class="fn org" | Cleekhimin
| class="adr" | North Lanarkshire
| class="note" | 
| class="note" | 
|- class="vcard"
| class="fn org" | Cleemarsh
| class="adr" | Shropshire
| class="note" | 
| class="note" | 
|- class="vcard"
| class="fn org" | Cleestanton
| class="adr" | Shropshire
| class="note" | 
| class="note" | 
|- class="vcard"
| class="fn org" | Clee St Margaret
| class="adr" | Shropshire
| class="note" | 
| class="note" | 
|- class="vcard"
| class="fn org" | Cleethorpes
| class="adr" | North East Lincolnshire
| class="note" | 
| class="note" | 
|- class="vcard"
| class="fn org" | Cleeton St Mary
| class="adr" | Shropshire
| class="note" | 
| class="note" | 
|- class="vcard"
| class="fn org" | Cleeve
| class="adr" | Gloucestershire
| class="note" | 
| class="note" | 
|- class="vcard"
| class="fn org" | Cleeve
| class="adr" | Oxfordshire
| class="note" | 
| class="note" | 
|- class="vcard"
| class="fn org" | Cleeve
| class="adr" | North Somerset
| class="note" | 
| class="note" | 
|- class="vcard"
| class="fn org" | Cleeve Hill
| class="adr" | Gloucestershire
| class="note" | 
| class="note" | 
|- class="vcard"
| class="fn org" | Cleeve Prior
| class="adr" | Worcestershire
| class="note" | 
| class="note" | 
|- class="vcard"
| class="fn org" | Cleghorn
| class="adr" | South Lanarkshire
| class="note" | 
| class="note" | 
|- class="vcard"
| class="fn org" | Clehonger
| class="adr" | Herefordshire
| class="note" | 
| class="note" | 
|- class="vcard"
| class="fn org" | Cleigh
| class="adr" | Argyll and Bute
| class="note" | 
| class="note" | 
|- class="vcard"
| class="fn org" | Cleish
| class="adr" | Perth and Kinross
| class="note" | 
| class="note" | 
|- class="vcard"
| class="fn org" | Cleland
| class="adr" | North Lanarkshire
| class="note" | 
| class="note" | 
|- class="vcard"
| class="fn org" | Clements End
| class="adr" | Gloucestershire
| class="note" | 
| class="note" | 
|- class="vcard"
| class="fn org" | Clement's End
| class="adr" | Bedfordshire
| class="note" | 
| class="note" | 
|- class="vcard"
| class="fn org" | Clement Street
| class="adr" | Kent
| class="note" | 
| class="note" | 
|- class="vcard"
| class="fn org" | Clench
| class="adr" | Wiltshire
| class="note" | 
| class="note" | 
|- class="vcard"
| class="fn org" | Clench Common
| class="adr" | Wiltshire
| class="note" | 
| class="note" | 
|- class="vcard"
| class="fn org" | Clencher's Mill
| class="adr" | Herefordshire
| class="note" | 
| class="note" | 
|- class="vcard"
| class="fn org" | Clenchwarton
| class="adr" | Norfolk
| class="note" | 
| class="note" | 
|- class="vcard"
| class="fn org" | Clennell
| class="adr" | Northumberland
| class="note" | 
| class="note" | 
|- class="vcard"
| class="fn org" | Clent
| class="adr" | Worcestershire
| class="note" | 
| class="note" | 
|- class="vcard"
| class="fn org" | Cleobury Mortimer
| class="adr" | Shropshire
| class="note" | 
| class="note" | 
|- class="vcard"
| class="fn org" | Cleobury North
| class="adr" | Shropshire
| class="note" | 
| class="note" | 
|- class="vcard"
| class="fn org" | Clephanton
| class="adr" | Highland
| class="note" | 
| class="note" | 
|- class="vcard"
| class="fn org" | Clerkenwater
| class="adr" | Cornwall
| class="note" | 
| class="note" | 
|- class="vcard"
| class="fn org" | Clerkenwell
| class="adr" | Camden
| class="note" | 
| class="note" | 
|- class="vcard"
| class="fn org" | Clerk Green
| class="adr" | Kirklees
| class="note" | 
| class="note" | 
|- class="vcard"
| class="fn org" | Clerkhill
| class="adr" | Aberdeenshire
| class="note" | 
| class="note" | 
|- class="vcard"
| class="fn org" | Clerklands
| class="adr" | Scottish Borders
| class="note" | 
| class="note" | 
|- class="vcard"
| class="fn org" | Clermiston
| class="adr" | City of Edinburgh
| class="note" | 
| class="note" | 
|- class="vcard"
| class="fn org" | Cleuch Head
| class="adr" | Scottish Borders
| class="note" | 
| class="note" | 
|- class="vcard"
| class="fn org" | Clevancy
| class="adr" | Wiltshire
| class="note" | 
| class="note" | 
|- class="vcard"
| class="fn org" | Clevans
| class="adr" | Renfrewshire
| class="note" | 
| class="note" | 
|- class="vcard"
| class="fn org" | Clevedon
| class="adr" | City of Bristol
| class="note" | 
| class="note" | 
|- class="vcard"
| class="fn org" | Cleveland Hills
| class="adr" | North Yorkshire
| class="note" | 
| class="note" | 
|- class="vcard"
| class="fn org" | Cleveley
| class="adr" | Oxfordshire
| class="note" | 
| class="note" | 
|- class="vcard"
| class="fn org" | Cleveleys
| class="adr" | Lancashire
| class="note" | 
| class="note" | 
|- class="vcard"
| class="fn org" | Cleverton
| class="adr" | Wiltshire
| class="note" | 
| class="note" | 
|- class="vcard"
| class="fn org" | Clewer
| class="adr" | Somerset
| class="note" | 
| class="note" | 
|- class="vcard"
| class="fn org" | Clewer Green
| class="adr" | Berkshire
| class="note" | 
| class="note" | 
|- class="vcard"
| class="fn org" | Clewer New Town
| class="adr" | Berkshire
| class="note" | 
| class="note" | 
|- class="vcard"
| class="fn org" | Clewer Village
| class="adr" | Berkshire
| class="note" | 
| class="note" | 
|- class="vcard"
| class="fn org" | Cley next the Sea
| class="adr" | Norfolk
| class="note" | 
| class="note" | 
|}

Cli

|- class="vcard"
| class="fn org" | Cliasay More
| class="adr" | Western Isles
| class="note" | 
| class="note" | 
|- class="vcard"
| class="fn org" | Clibberswick
| class="adr" | Shetland Islands
| class="note" | 
| class="note" | 
|- class="vcard"
| class="fn org" | Cliburn
| class="adr" | Cumbria
| class="note" | 
| class="note" | 
|- class="vcard"
| class="fn org" | Cliddesden
| class="adr" | Hampshire
| class="note" | 
| class="note" | 
|- class="vcard"
| class="fn org" | Cliff
| class="adr" | Derbyshire
| class="note" | 
| class="note" | 
|- class="vcard"
| class="fn org" | Cliff
| class="adr" | Highland
| class="note" | 
| class="note" | 
|- class="vcard"
| class="fn org" | Cliff
| class="adr" | Warwickshire
| class="note" | 
| class="note" | 
|- class="vcard"
| class="fn org" | Cliff
| class="adr" | Western Isles
| class="note" | 
| class="note" | 
|- class="vcard"
| class="fn org" | Cliffburn
| class="adr" | Angus
| class="note" | 
| class="note" | 
|- class="vcard"
| class="fn org" | Cliffe
| class="adr" | Lancashire
| class="note" | 
| class="note" | 
|- class="vcard"
| class="fn org" | Cliffe (Richmondshire)
| class="adr" | North Yorkshire
| class="note" | 
| class="note" | 
|- class="vcard"
| class="fn org" | Cliffe (Selby)
| class="adr" | North Yorkshire
| class="note" | 
| class="note" | 
|- class="vcard"
| class="fn org" | Cliffe
| class="adr" | Kent
| class="note" | 
| class="note" | 
|- class="vcard"
| class="fn org" | Cliff End
| class="adr" | East Sussex
| class="note" | 
| class="note" | 
|- class="vcard"
| class="fn org" | Cliff End
| class="adr" | Kirklees
| class="note" | 
| class="note" | 
|- class="vcard"
| class="fn org" | Cliffe Woods
| class="adr" | Kent
| class="note" | 
| class="note" | 
|- class="vcard"
| class="fn org" | Clifford
| class="adr" | Devon
| class="note" | 
| class="note" | 
|- class="vcard"
| class="fn org" | Clifford
| class="adr" | Herefordshire
| class="note" | 
| class="note" | 
|- class="vcard"
| class="fn org" | Clifford
| class="adr" | Leeds
| class="note" | 
| class="note" | 
|- class="vcard"
| class="fn org" | Clifford Chambers
| class="adr" | Warwickshire
| class="note" | 
| class="note" | 
|- class="vcard"
| class="fn org" | Clifford's Mesne
| class="adr" | Gloucestershire
| class="note" | 
| class="note" | 
|- class="vcard"
| class="fn org" | Cliffs End
| class="adr" | Kent
| class="note" | 
| class="note" | 
|- class="vcard"
| class="fn org" | Clifftown
| class="adr" | Essex
| class="note" | 
| class="note" | 
|- class="vcard"
| class="fn org" | Clifton
| class="adr" | Bedfordshire
| class="note" | 
| class="note" | 
|- class="vcard"
| class="fn org" | Clifton
| class="adr" | Calderdale
| class="note" | 
| class="note" | 
|- class="vcard"
| class="fn org" | Clifton
| class="adr" | Cheshire
| class="note" | 
| class="note" | 
|- class="vcard"
| class="fn org" | Clifton
| class="adr" | Cumbria
| class="note" | 
| class="note" | 
|- class="vcard"
| class="fn org" | Clifton
| class="adr" | Derbyshire
| class="note" | 
| class="note" | 
|- class="vcard"
| class="fn org" | Clifton
| class="adr" | Devon
| class="note" | 
| class="note" | 
|- class="vcard"
| class="fn org" | Clifton
| class="adr" | Doncaster
| class="note" | 
| class="note" | 
|- class="vcard"
| class="fn org" | Clifton
| class="adr" | Worcestershire
| class="note" | 
| class="note" | 
|- class="vcard"
| class="fn org" | Clifton
| class="adr" | Lancashire
| class="note" | 
| class="note" | 
|- class="vcard"
| class="fn org" | Clifton
| class="adr" | Bristol
| class="note" | 
| class="note" | 
|- class="vcard"
| class="fn org" | Clifton
| class="adr" | North Yorkshire
| class="note" | 
| class="note" | 
|- class="vcard"
| class="fn org" | Clifton
| class="adr" | Northumberland
| class="note" | 
| class="note" | 
|- class="vcard"
| class="fn org" | Clifton
| class="adr" | Nottinghamshire
| class="note" | 
| class="note" | 
|- class="vcard"
| class="fn org" | Clifton
| class="adr" | Oxfordshire
| class="note" | 
| class="note" | 
|- class="vcard"
| class="fn org" | Clifton
| class="adr" | Rotherham
| class="note" | 
| class="note" | 
|- class="vcard"
| class="fn org" | Clifton
| class="adr" | Salford
| class="note" | 
| class="note" | 
|- class="vcard"
| class="fn org" | Clifton
| class="adr" | Stirling
| class="note" | 
| class="note" | 
|- class="vcard"
| class="fn org" | Clifton
| class="adr" | York
| class="note" | 
| class="note" | 
|- class="vcard"
| class="fn org" | Clifton Campville
| class="adr" | Staffordshire
| class="note" | 
| class="note" | 
|- class="vcard"
| class="fn org" | Clifton Green
| class="adr" | Salford
| class="note" | 
| class="note" | 
|- class="vcard"
| class="fn org" | Clifton Hampden
| class="adr" | Oxfordshire
| class="note" | 
| class="note" | 
|- class="vcard"
| class="fn org" | Clifton Junction
| class="adr" | Salford
| class="note" | 
| class="note" | 
|- class="vcard"
| class="fn org" | Clifton Maybank
| class="adr" | Dorset
| class="note" | 
| class="note" | 
|- class="vcard"
| class="fn org" | Clifton Reynes
| class="adr" | Milton Keynes
| class="note" | 
| class="note" | 
|- class="vcard"
| class="fn org" | Clifton upon Dunsmore
| class="adr" | Warwickshire
| class="note" | 
| class="note" | 
|- class="vcard"
| class="fn org" | Clifton Upton Teme
| class="adr" | Worcestershire
| class="note" | 
| class="note" | 
|- class="vcard"
| class="fn org" | Cliftonville
| class="adr" | Kent
| class="note" | 
| class="note" | 
|- class="vcard"
| class="fn org" | Cliftonville
| class="adr" | Norfolk
| class="note" | 
| class="note" | 
|- class="vcard"
| class="fn org" | Cliftonville
| class="adr" | North Lanarkshire
| class="note" | 
| class="note" | 
|- class="vcard"
| class="fn org" | Climping
| class="adr" | West Sussex
| class="note" | 
| class="note" | 
|- class="vcard"
| class="fn org" | Clinkham Wood
| class="adr" | St Helens
| class="note" | 
| class="note" | 
|- class="vcard"
| class="fn org" | Clint
| class="adr" | North Yorkshire
| class="note" | 
| class="note" | 
|- class="vcard"
| class="fn org" | Clint Green
| class="adr" | Norfolk
| class="note" | 
| class="note" | 
|- class="vcard"
| class="fn org" | Clints
| class="adr" | North Yorkshire
| class="note" | 
| class="note" | 
|- class="vcard"
| class="fn org" | Clipiau
| class="adr" | Powys
| class="note" | 
| class="note" | 
|- class="vcard"
| class="fn org" | Clippesby
| class="adr" | Norfolk
| class="note" | 
| class="note" | 
|- class="vcard"
| class="fn org" | Clippings Green
| class="adr" | Norfolk
| class="note" | 
| class="note" | 
|- class="vcard"
| class="fn org" | Clipsham
| class="adr" | Rutland
| class="note" | 
| class="note" | 
|- class="vcard"
| class="fn org" | Clipston
| class="adr" | Northamptonshire
| class="note" | 
| class="note" | 
|- class="vcard"
| class="fn org" | Clipston
| class="adr" | Nottinghamshire
| class="note" | 
| class="note" | 
|- class="vcard"
| class="fn org" | Clipstone
| class="adr" | Bedfordshire
| class="note" | 
| class="note" | 
|- class="vcard"
| class="fn org" | Clipstone
| class="adr" | Nottinghamshire
| class="note" | 
| class="note" | 
|- class="vcard"
| class="fn org" | Clisham
| class="adr" | Western Isles
| class="note" | 
| class="note" | 
|- class="vcard"
| class="fn org" | Clitheroe
| class="adr" | Lancashire
| class="note" | 
| class="note" | 
|- class="vcard"
| class="fn org" | Cliton Manor
| class="adr" | Bedfordshire
| class="note" | 
| class="note" | 
|- class="vcard"
| class="fn org" | Cliuthar
| class="adr" | Western Isles
| class="note" | 
| class="note" | 
|- class="vcard"
| class="fn org" | Clive
| class="adr" | Cheshire
| class="note" | 
| class="note" | 
|- class="vcard"
| class="fn org" | Clive
| class="adr" | Shropshire
| class="note" | 
| class="note" | 
|- class="vcard"
| class="fn org" | Clive Green
| class="adr" | Cheshire
| class="note" | 
| class="note" | 
|- class="vcard"
| class="fn org" | Clive Vale
| class="adr" | East Sussex
| class="note" | 
| class="note" | 
|- class="vcard"
| class="fn org" | Clivocast
| class="adr" | Shetland Islands
| class="note" | 
| class="note" | 
|- class="vcard"
| class="fn org" | Clixby
| class="adr" | Lincolnshire
| class="note" | 
| class="note" | 
|}

Clo

|- class="vcard"
| class="fn org" | Cloatley
| class="adr" | Wiltshire
| class="note" | 
| class="note" | 
|- class="vcard"
| class="fn org" | Cloatley End
| class="adr" | Wiltshire
| class="note" | 
| class="note" | 
|- class="vcard"
| class="fn org" | Clocaenog
| class="adr" | Denbighshire
| class="note" | 
| class="note" | 
|- class="vcard"
| class="fn org" | Clochan
| class="adr" | Moray
| class="note" | 
| class="note" | 
|- class="vcard"
| class="fn org" | Clock Face
| class="adr" | St Helens
| class="note" | 
| class="note" | 
|- class="vcard"
| class="fn org" | Clock House
| class="adr" | Sutton
| class="note" | 
| class="note" | 
|- class="vcard"
| class="fn org" | Clock Mills
| class="adr" | Herefordshire
| class="note" | 
| class="note" | 
|- class="vcard"
| class="fn org" | Cloddiau
| class="adr" | Powys
| class="note" | 
| class="note" | 
|- class="vcard"
| class="fn org" | Cloddymoss
| class="adr" | Moray
| class="note" | 
| class="note" | 
|- class="vcard"
| class="fn org" | Clodock
| class="adr" | Herefordshire
| class="note" | 
| class="note" | 
|- class="vcard"
| class="fn org" | Cloford
| class="adr" | Somerset
| class="note" | 
| class="note" | 
|- class="vcard"
| class="fn org" | Cloford Common
| class="adr" | Somerset
| class="note" | 
| class="note" | 
|- class="vcard"
| class="fn org" | Cloigyn
| class="adr" | Carmarthenshire
| class="note" | 
| class="note" | 
|- class="vcard"
| class="fn org" | Clola
| class="adr" | Aberdeenshire
| class="note" | 
| class="note" | 
|- class="vcard"
| class="fn org" | Clophill
| class="adr" | Bedfordshire
| class="note" | 
| class="note" | 
|- class="vcard"
| class="fn org" | Clopton
| class="adr" | Northamptonshire
| class="note" | 
| class="note" | 
|- class="vcard"
| class="fn org" | Clopton Corner
| class="adr" | Suffolk
| class="note" | 
| class="note" | 
|- class="vcard"
| class="fn org" | Clopton Green (Rattlesden)
| class="adr" | Suffolk
| class="note" | 
| class="note" | 
|- class="vcard"
| class="fn org" | Clopton Green (Wickhambrook)
| class="adr" | Suffolk
| class="note" | 
| class="note" | 
|- class="vcard"
| class="fn org" | Closeburn
| class="adr" | Dumfries and Galloway
| class="note" | 
| class="note" | 
|- class="vcard"
| class="fn org" | Close House
| class="adr" | Durham
| class="note" | 
| class="note" | 
|- class="vcard"
| class="fn org" | Closworth
| class="adr" | Somerset
| class="note" | 
| class="note" | 
|- class="vcard"
| class="fn org" | Clothall
| class="adr" | Hertfordshire
| class="note" | 
| class="note" | 
|- class="vcard"
| class="fn org" | Clothall Common
| class="adr" | Hertfordshire
| class="note" | 
| class="note" | 
|- class="vcard"
| class="fn org" | Clotton
| class="adr" | Cheshire
| class="note" | 
| class="note" | 
|- class="vcard"
| class="fn org" | Clotton Common
| class="adr" | Cheshire
| class="note" | 
| class="note" | 
|- class="vcard"
| class="fn org" | Cloudesley Bush
| class="adr" | Warwickshire
| class="note" | 
| class="note" | 
|- class="vcard"
| class="fn org" | Clouds
| class="adr" | Herefordshire
| class="note" | 
| class="note" | 
|- class="vcard"
| class="fn org" | Cloud Side
| class="adr" | Staffordshire
| class="note" | 
| class="note" | 
|- class="vcard"
| class="fn org" | Clough
| class="adr" | Kirklees
| class="note" | 
| class="note" | 
|- class="vcard"
| class="fn org" | Clough
| class="adr" | Oldham
| class="note" | 
| class="note" | 
|- class="vcard"
| class="fn org" | Clough
| class="adr" | Rochdale
| class="note" | 
| class="note" | 
|- class="vcard"
| class="fn org" | Clough Dene
| class="adr" | Durham
| class="note" | 
| class="note" | 
|- class="vcard"
| class="fn org" | Cloughfold
| class="adr" | Lancashire
| class="note" | 
| class="note" | 
|- class="vcard"
| class="fn org" | Clough Foot
| class="adr" | Calderdale
| class="note" | 
| class="note" | 
|- class="vcard"
| class="fn org" | Clough Hall
| class="adr" | Staffordshire
| class="note" | 
| class="note" | 
|- class="vcard"
| class="fn org" | Clough Head
| class="adr" | Calderdale
| class="note" | 
| class="note" | 
|- class="vcard"
| class="fn org" | Clough Head
| class="adr" | Kirklees
| class="note" | 
| class="note" | 
|- class="vcard"
| class="fn org" | Cloughton
| class="adr" | North Yorkshire
| class="note" | 
| class="note" | 
|- class="vcard"
| class="fn org" | Cloughton Newlands
| class="adr" | North Yorkshire
| class="note" | 
| class="note" | 
|- class="vcard"
| class="fn org" | Clousta
| class="adr" | Shetland Islands
| class="note" | 
| class="note" | 
|- class="vcard"
| class="fn org" | Clouston
| class="adr" | Orkney Islands
| class="note" | 
| class="note" | 
|- class="vcard"
| class="fn org" | Clova
| class="adr" | Angus
| class="note" | 
| class="note" | 
|- class="vcard"
| class="fn org" | Clovelly
| class="adr" | Devon
| class="note" | 
| class="note" | 
|- class="vcard"
| class="fn org" | Clovenfords
| class="adr" | Scottish Borders
| class="note" | 
| class="note" | 
|- class="vcard"
| class="fn org" | Clovenstone
| class="adr" | Aberdeenshire
| class="note" | 
| class="note" | 
|- class="vcard"
| class="fn org" | Clovullin
| class="adr" | Highland
| class="note" | 
| class="note" | 
|- class="vcard"
| class="fn org" | Clowance Wood
| class="adr" | Cornwall
| class="note" | 
| class="note" | 
|- class="vcard"
| class="fn org" | Clow Bridge
| class="adr" | Lancashire
| class="note" | 
| class="note" | 
|- class="vcard"
| class="fn org" | Clowne
| class="adr" | Derbyshire
| class="note" | 
| class="note" | 
|- class="vcard"
| class="fn org" | Clows Top
| class="adr" | Worcestershire
| class="note" | 
| class="note" | 
|- class="vcard"
| class="fn org" | Cloy
| class="adr" | Wrexham
| class="note" | 
| class="note" | 
|}

Clu

|- class="vcard"
| class="fn org" | Clubmoor
| class="adr" | Liverpool
| class="note" | 
| class="note" | 
|- class="vcard"
| class="fn org" | Clubworthy
| class="adr" | Cornwall
| class="note" | 
| class="note" | 
|- class="vcard"
| class="fn org" | Cluddley
| class="adr" | Shropshire
| class="note" | 
| class="note" | 
|- class="vcard"
| class="fn org" | Clun
| class="adr" | Shropshire
| class="note" | 
| class="note" | 
|- class="vcard"
| class="fn org" | Clunbury
| class="adr" | Shropshire
| class="note" | 
| class="note" | 
|- class="vcard"
| class="fn org" | Clunderwen
| class="adr" | Carmarthenshire
| class="note" | 
| class="note" | 
|- class="vcard"
| class="fn org" | Clune
| class="adr" | Highland
| class="note" | 
| class="note" | 
|- class="vcard"
| class="fn org" | Clunes
| class="adr" | Highland
| class="note" | 
| class="note" | 
|- class="vcard"
| class="fn org" | Clungunford
| class="adr" | Shropshire
| class="note" | 
| class="note" | 
|- class="vcard"
| class="fn org" | Clunie
| class="adr" | Perth and Kinross
| class="note" | 
| class="note" | 
|- class="vcard"
| class="fn org" | Clunton
| class="adr" | Shropshire
| class="note" | 
| class="note" | 
|- class="vcard"
| class="fn org" | Cluny
| class="adr" | Fife
| class="note" | 
| class="note" | 
|- class="vcard"
| class="fn org" | Clutton
| class="adr" | Cheshire
| class="note" | 
| class="note" | 
|- class="vcard"
| class="fn org" | Clutton
| class="adr" | Bath and North East Somerset
| class="note" | 
| class="note" | 
|- class="vcard"
| class="fn org" | Clutton Hill
| class="adr" | Bath and North East Somerset
| class="note" | 
| class="note" | 
|}

Clw

|- class="vcard"
| class="fn org" | Clwt-y-bont
| class="adr" | Gwynedd
| class="note" | 
| class="note" | 
|- class="vcard"
| class="fn org" | Clwydyfagwyr
| class="adr" | Merthyr Tydfil
| class="note" | 
| class="note" | 
|}

Cly

|- class="vcard"
| class="fn org" | Clydach
| class="adr" | Monmouthshire
| class="note" | 
| class="note" | 
|- class="vcard"
| class="fn org" | Clydach
| class="adr" | Swansea
| class="note" | 
| class="note" | 
|- class="vcard"
| class="fn org" | Clydach Terrace
| class="adr" | Blaenau Gwent
| class="note" | 
| class="note" | 
|- class="vcard"
| class="fn org" | Clydach Vale
| class="adr" | Rhondda, Cynon, Taff
| class="note" | 
| class="note" | 
|- class="vcard"
| class="fn org" | Clydebank
| class="adr" | Renfrewshire
| class="note" | 
| class="note" | 
|- class="vcard"
| class="fn org" | Clyffe Pypard
| class="adr" | Wiltshire
| class="note" | 
| class="note" | 
|- class="vcard"
| class="fn org" | Clynder
| class="adr" | Argyll and Bute
| class="note" | 
| class="note" | 
|- class="vcard"
| class="fn org" | Clyne
| class="adr" | Neath Port Talbot
| class="note" | 
| class="note" | 
|- class="vcard"
| class="fn org" | Clynnog fawr
| class="adr" | Gwynedd
| class="note" | 
| class="note" | 
|- class="vcard"
| class="fn org" | Clyro
| class="adr" | Powys
| class="note" | 
| class="note" | 
|- class="vcard"
| class="fn org" | Clyst Honiton
| class="adr" | Devon
| class="note" | 
| class="note" | 
|- class="vcard"
| class="fn org" | Clyst Hydon
| class="adr" | Devon
| class="note" | 
| class="note" | 
|- class="vcard"
| class="fn org" | Clyst St George
| class="adr" | Devon
| class="note" | 
| class="note" | 
|- class="vcard"
| class="fn org" | Clyst St Lawrence
| class="adr" | Devon
| class="note" | 
| class="note" | 
|- class="vcard"
| class="fn org" | Clyst St Mary
| class="adr" | Devon
| class="note" | 
| class="note" | 
|}

Cn

|- class="vcard"
| class="fn org" | Cnoc Amhlaigh
| class="adr" | Western Isles
| class="note" | 
| class="note" | 
|- class="vcard"
| class="fn org" | Cnoc an t-Solais
| class="adr" | Western Isles
| class="note" | 
| class="note" | 
|- class="vcard"
| class="fn org" | Cnoc Ard
| class="adr" | Western Isles
| class="note" | 
| class="note" | 
|- class="vcard"
| class="fn org" | Cnocbreac
| class="adr" | Argyll and Bute
| class="note" | 
| class="note" | 
|- class="vcard"
| class="fn org" | Cnoc Mairi
| class="adr" | Western Isles
| class="note" | 
| class="note" | 
|- class="vcard"
| class="fn org" | Cnoc nan Gobhar
| class="adr" | Western Isles
| class="note" | 
| class="note" | 
|- class="vcard"
| class="fn org" | Cnwch Coch
| class="adr" | Ceredigion
| class="note" | 
| class="note" | 
|}